Serena Williams defeated her sister Venus Williams in the final, 7–5, 6–3 to win the women's singles tennis title at the 2002 French Open. It was her first French Open title, second major singles title overall, and her first step towards completing her first "Serena Slam", a non-calendar year Grand Slam and career Grand Slam. 

Jennifer Capriati was the defending champion, but lost to Serena Williams in the semifinals.

This marked the first major in which future world No. 2 Vera Zvonareva competed in the main draw. She lost to Serena Williams in the fourth round.

Seeds

Qualifying

Draw

Finals

Top half

Section 1

Section 2

Section 3

Section 4

Bottom half

Section 5

Section 6

Section 7

Section 8

References

External links
2002 French Open – Women's draws and results at the International Tennis Federation

Women's Singles
French Open by year – Women's singles
French Open - Women's Singles
French Open – singles
French Open – singles